Charles H. "Colorado Charlie" Utter (March 14, 1838 – July 3, 1915) was a figure of the American Wild West, best known as a great friend and companion of Wild Bill Hickok. He was also friends with Calamity Jane.

Early life 
Utter was born in 1838 near Niagara Falls, New York, and grew up in Illinois, then traveled west in search of his fortune, becoming a trapper, guide, and prospector in Colorado in the 1860s. He met and married 15 year old Matilda "Tily" Nash on September 30, 1866, in her parents' home in Empire, Clear Creek, Colorado Territory. Their marriage record lists Empire as his place of residence at the time of their marriage and by the 1870 Federal Census shows they had settled in nearby Georgetown, Colorado Territory.

Career 
In early 1876, Utter and his brother Steve took a 30-wagon train of prospectors, gamblers, prostitutes, and assorted hopefuls from Georgetown, Colorado, to the burgeoning town of Deadwood in the Black Hills of the Dakota Territory, where the recent discovery of gold had sparked a gold rush. Like many wagon trains, the wagons were Schuttler wagons, which were notable for "gaudy paint jobs." In Cheyenne, Wyoming, famed gunman "Wild Bill" Hickok became partners with Utter in the train; Calamity Jane joined in Fort Laramie. The wagon train arrived in Deadwood in July 1876, and Utter began a lucrative pony express delivery service to Cheyenne, charging 25 cents to deliver a letter and often carrying as many as 2,000 letters per 48-hour trip.

"Wild Bill" Hickok 
Utter had been a close friend of Hickok's for some time previously, constantly watching to ensure that Hickok's weaknesses of alcohol and gambling would not bring Hickok to a bad end. Unfortunately, Utter was not present on August 2, 1876, when Jack McCall fatally shot Hickok in the back of the head as Hickok played poker in a Deadwood saloon. Utter later claimed the body and placed a notice in the local newspaper, the Black Hills Pioneer, which read:
"Died in Deadwood, Black Hills, August 2, 1876, from the effects of a pistol shot, J. B. Hickok (Wild Bill) formerly of Cheyenne, Wyoming. Funeral services will be held at Charlie Utter's Camp, on Thursday afternoon, August 3, 1876, at 3 o'clock, P. M. All are respectfully invited to attend."

Attendance at the funeral was heavy, and Utter had Hickok buried with a wooden grave marker which read:
"Wild Bill, J. B. Hickock killed by the assassin Jack McCall in Deadwood, Black Hills, August 2d, 1876. Pard, we will meet again in the happy hunting ground to part no more. Good bye, Colorado Charlie, C. H. Utter."

Utter left for Colorado, but returned in 1879 to have Hickok re-interred, at Calamity Jane's urging, in a ten-foot-square plot at the Mount Moriah Cemetery, surrounded by a cast-iron fence and with an American flag in the ground.

In February 1879, Utter purchased the Eaves Saloon in Gayville, a mining town 1.75 miles (2.82 km) west of Deadwood, but ran into a string of bad luck. He was found guilty of selling liquor without a license.

Later that year, Utter opened a dance hall in Lead, a company town far more sedate than its raucous, rollicking neighbor, Deadwood. The dance hall's "boisterous music and scandalous cancan dancing" earned Charlie an appearance before the honorable Gideon C. Moody. Charlie was convicted of "operating a nuisance," but because he had already closed the establishment, Judge Moody sentenced him to a mere one hour in jail. He was also fined $50 on the charge of disturbing the peace.

Utter was back in Deadwood by the fall of the year. He opened another dance hall and also managed one of Deadwood's theaters. On September 26, 1879, a fire devastated Deadwood, destroying more than three hundred buildings (including Charlie's dance hall and the theater he managed) and consuming the belongings of many inhabitants.

After Deadwood 
Following the destructive fire, Deadwood ceased to be a frontier town where fortunes could be built (or rebuilt) from nothing, and the newly impoverished left to try their luck in other gold rushes. Utter followed, first to Leadville, Colorado in February 1880; then Durango, Colorado showing separated or divorced from his wife; then Socorro, New Mexico, where he opened a saloon and was reported to have a relationship with faro dealer Minnie Fowler. Utter's biographer, Agnes Wright Spring, traced him to Panama in the early 1900s. Now losing his eyesight, he owned drugstores in Panama City and Colón.
According to ship manifests, Utter made several trips back and forth between the United States and Panama in 1888, 1891, 1905, 1910, 1912 each listing his occupation as a "druggist". He finally returned to Panama in 1913. His gravestone is in Cementario Amador, Calle B, Santa Ana, Panama listed as Charles H. Utter having died on July 3, 1915. There is an Emma B. Utter wife of Charles H. Utter buried nearby in the same cemetery who died in 1894.

Personality 
Utter cut a notable figure; he was 5'6" (167 cm), and was reported as being meticulous in his appearance, highly unusual for that place and time. He had long, flowing black hair and a moustache, perfectly groomed, wore hand-tailored fringed buckskins, fine linen shirts, beaded moccasins, and a large silver belt buckle and carried a pair of gold, silver and pearl ornamented pistols. He would allow nobody into his tent, even Hickok, on pain of being shot; in his tent he slept under the highest quality blankets, imported from California and carried with him mirrors, combs, razors, and whisk brooms. Most unusual of all, he was well known for his "bizarre habit" of bathing daily.

In popular culture  
Utter is portrayed by Dayton Callie in the HBO television series Deadwood and Deadwood: The Movie. Contrary to the meticulous historical Utter, the character is portrayed as rough-mannered and often unkempt in his appearance. The film, set in 1889, shows the character still living in Deadwood, although the historical Charlie Utter had moved back to Colorado in 1880. The film also shows Utter being murdered in 1889 by henchmen sent by George Hearst, after Utter declined to sell his land to Hearst.

Further reading 
 Boardman, Mark. "More Than a Sidekick: Charlie Utter blazed his own trail in the West," True West (March 29, 2019).
 Mallet, E.J. Jr. Scribner's Monthly (September 1872).
 Robinson, Doane. Encyclopedia of South Dakota (Pierre, S.D., 1925), pp. 669–670.

References

External links 
 "Charlie (Charley) Utter aka 'Colorado Charlie,' Deadwood, S.D. Revealed
 "Charlie Utter – Bill Hickok's Best Pard," Legends of America website
 "Charlie Utter," Black Hills Visitor
 "Deadwood Character: Charlie Utter," The Deadwood Chronicles
 Hall, Sharon. "Wild West Wednesday: Charles 'Colorado Charlie' Utter," Digging History Magazine (February 26, 2014).

1838 births
American prospectors
People from Deadwood, South Dakota
People from Niagara Falls, New York
People of the American Old West
1915 deaths